Durlston is an area of Swanage, in Dorset, England.  The area was developed by George Burt as a residential suburb, and includes many large Victorian villas as well as modern developments.

Durlston Country Park

Durlston has a country park overlooking Durlston Bay, with a mock castle built in 1887.  The castle (a restaurant when built, and still in use as a cafe) is surrounded by stone ornaments, including the Great Globe, three metres in diameter. The area is now owned and managed by Dorset County Council.  There is a modern visitors' centre on the hillside above the castle.

References

External links

Swanage
National nature reserves in England
Villages in Dorset